The 2019 season is the 21st season of competitive association football in Abkhazia.

National teams

Abkhazia national football team

Results and fixtures

2019 CONIFA European Football Cup

Group A

Semi-finals

Third-place match

Men's football

Victory Cup

The results of Gagra vs Nath Aqwa and Dinamo Aqwa are unknown, but it is known that Gagra finished second.

Final

Cup competitions

Abkhazian Cup

Group stage

Group A

Group B

Semi-finals

Final

Super Cup

Final

References

2019 sport-related lists
Football in Abkhazia
2019 in European football